is a Japanese crime fiction and horror writer. She is a member of the Mystery Writers of Japan.

Nonami attended Waseda University where she studied Sociology but dropped out to take a job at an advertising agency.  She became a published author in 1988.

Works in English translation
Crime/thriller novels
 The Hunter (original title: Kogoeru Kiba), trans. Juliet Winters Carpenter (Kodansha International, 2006)
 Now You're One of Us (original title: Anki), trans. Michael Volek and Mitsuko Volek (Vertical, 2007)
Short horror story collection
 Body (original title: Karada), trans. Takami Nieda (Vertical, 2012)

Awards
 1988 – The Japanese Mystery and Suspense Award (Nihon Suiri Sasupensu Taisho): Kōfuku na Chōshoku (A Happy Breakfast)
 1996 – Naoki Prize: The Hunter
 2011 – Chuokoron Prize for Literature: Chi no Hate kara

Main works

Detective Takako Otomichi series
Novels
 , 1996 
 The Hunter, Kodansha International, 2006. , 
 , 2000
 , 2006
Short story collections
 , 1999
 , 2001
 , 2004

Standalone novels
 , 1988
 , 1993 
Now You're One of Us, Vertical, 2007. , 
 , 2000
 , 2010

Short story collections
 , 1999 
Body, Vertical, 2012. , 
 , 2010

Film adaptations
Japanese film
 Heels of the Muse (2005) (Based on Nonami's short story )

South Korean film
 Howling (2012) (Based on Nonami's novel The Hunter)

See also

Japanese detective fiction

Notes

References
 Profile at J'Lit Books from Japan 
 Nonami's Profile and Reviews of Now You're One of Us at Vertical, Inc.

External links
 Twitter

1960 births
20th-century Japanese novelists
21st-century Japanese novelists
Japanese women short story writers
Japanese mystery writers
Japanese crime fiction writers
Japanese horror writers
Living people
Writers from Tokyo
Women mystery writers
Women horror writers
Japanese women novelists
21st-century Japanese women writers
20th-century Japanese women writers
20th-century Japanese short story writers
21st-century Japanese short story writers